Hugo Toeppen (October 8, 1853 – September 26, 1933) was an American wrestler. He competed in the men's freestyle welterweight at the 1904 Summer Olympics. Toeppen was 51 years and 6 days old when he competed at the Olympics, making him the oldest individual to compete in wrestling at the Olympics.

References

External links
 

1853 births
1933 deaths
American male sport wrestlers
Congress Poland emigrants to the United States
Olympic wrestlers of the United States
Wrestlers at the 1904 Summer Olympics